John Anderson (born May 16, 1955) is an American college baseball coach and former pitcher. He is the head baseball coach at the University of Minnesota. Anderson played college baseball at the University of Minnesota from 1974 to 1975, until injuries ended his career. In 38 seasons (as of the end of the 2019 season), Anderson has led the Golden Gophers to a record of 1,317 wins, 887 losses and three ties.  In the Big Ten he has led Golden Gophers to a record of 592 wins and 351 losses in that same span.

Playing career
Anderson graduated from Nashwauk-Keewatin High School in Nashwauk, Minnesota in 1973. Anderson would next enroll at the University of Minnesota, where he would walk-on to the Minnesota Golden Gophers baseball team. After pitching for two years, an arm injury forced Anderson to quit playing. He remained as a student coach for the next two years, and was even voted as MVP of the 1977 team.

Coaching career
Following his graduation in 1977, longtime Gophers coach Dick Siebert named him a graduate assistant. Siebert died in the winter of 1978, and successor George Thomas named Anderson a full-time assistant. Thomas resigned in 1981, and Anderson became head coach at the age of 26–at the time, the youngest head baseball coach in Big Ten history. He has spent his entire adult life at the U of M as a player, assistant coach or head coach.

His most successful team was the 2018 unit, which reached the super regional round–the Gophers' deepest tournament run since their last College World Series appearance in 1977.

Head coaching record
Below is a table of Anderson's yearly records as an NCAA head baseball coach.

Awards and honors
Big Ten Coach of the Year (1982, 2000, 2002, 2003, 2004, 2010, 2016, 2018)
ABCA Hall of Fame Inductee

Personal
Anderson graduated from the University of Minnesota in 1977 with a B.S. in Education. Anderson and his wife Jan are the parents of daughter Erin Elizabeth.

See also
List of current NCAA Division I baseball coaches
List of college baseball coaches with 1,100 wins

References

External links
Gophersports.com Bio

1955 births
Living people
Minnesota Golden Gophers baseball coaches
Minnesota Golden Gophers baseball players
Sportspeople from Hibbing, Minnesota